is a Japanese television series which premiered on Fuji TV on April 24, 2011. This television series stars Sadao Abe as Mamoru Takagi, a public relations officer with a stationery company. It also stars child actor Fuku Suzuki and child actress Mana Ashida as Mamoru's late friend Jun-ichiro's twin children.

The television series was broadcast as part of the Fuji TV's Dramatic Sunday time slot, which airs every Sunday from 9 pm to 9:54 pm.

Plot 
Mamoru Takagi's best friend, Jun-ichiro Sasakura, suddenly dies from cancer, leaving behind his twin children, Kaoru and Tomoki. The children's mother had abandoned them when they were young, and they had no other dependents left. The twins' relatives argue over who will take responsibility for them. In the end, the twins are separated. However, the twins are extremely close, and both run away from their respective foster families. Marumo manages to find them, and after a brief struggle to bring them back, Marumo gives in and agrees that the twins can stay with him. Along the way back, a dog, which has been following Tomoki, follows them back to Marumo's house.

Marumo has no parenting experience, but he makes a great parent. He manages to care for the twins, together with the help of his landlord and the landlord's daughter. Over time, they face many challenges, with Marumo trying hard to balance his time between his work and taking care of the twins.

Cast

Takagi's Household 
Sadao Abe as 
Marumo is a single man working in the customer service center at a leading stationery manufacturer, "Akebono Stationery Company". The young Mamoru was played by Takanori Shimizu.
Mana Ashida as 
Fuku Suzuki as

Izakaya "Kujira" 
Masanori Sera as 
Manami Higa as

Akebono Stationary Company 
Masato Ibu as
Saori Takizawa as 
Yu Koyanagi as 
Masako Chiba as 
Erica Tonooka (Idoling!!!) as 
Hiroyuki Yamamoto as 
Tomohiro Ogawa as 
Nobuaki Mitsuda as

Hirokawa Elementary School, Sumida 
Shinji Rokkaku as 
Class 1 of the 1st grade
Yasunari Kijima as 
Miyu Honda as 
and others

Others 
Shingo Katsurayama as 
His childhood version was played by Junki Shimoda.
Satoshi Nikaido as 
Kyoko Maya as 
Mayu Tsuruta as 
Miyoko Yoshimoto as 
Kazuya Kojima (UN-JASH) as 
Koutaro Tanaka as

Production 
Marumo no Okite was first announced by Fuji TV on February 25, 2011. Apparently the name "Marumo" comes from the children's mispronunciation of Mamoru's name. "Okite" in this context means a promise or agreement in the Japanese language.

This television series will star actor Sadao Abe, child actor Fuku Suzuki, and child actress Mana Ashida. Sadao Abe will play Mamoru Takagi, a single man who is an employee at a stationery maker. He said that he had "suddenly become a father on Sunday nights" and that he looked forward to his role in this series. Actress Mana Ashida previously made headlines in Japan for being the youngest lead star in a Japanese television drama when she starred in a NTV 2-hour long special, Sayonara Bokutachi no Youchien. She is also noted for her role in the 2009 television series Mother. This will be her first lead role in a Japanese television series. Together with child actor Suzuki Fuku, they will play Mamoru's deceased friend's twin children.

On April 4, 2011, it was announced that Mana Ashida and her co-star Fuku Suzuki would team up to produce tdrama's theme song in their debut as singers. This theme song will be entitled , and it will include sections where the talking dog, Mook, will sing. The song takes its name from the fact that Ashida will play the character Kaoru, while Suzuki will play the character named Tomoki. The Mook is from the talking dog's name. Hamada Miwako, the choreographer for the hit song Gake no Ue no Ponyo was the song's choreographer. The single album for the song Maru Maru Mori Mori! was released on May 25.

Ryo Oka also voiced the talking dog, Mook

In the last episode of Marumo no Okite, it was revealed that the show would have a special program but that the program's broadcast date was unconfirmed. Later, on September 2, Fuji TV announced that the program would be aired on October 9, 2011.

Broadcast 
Marumo no Okite was aired in the Fuji Television's Dramatic Sunday television drama time slot, which is aired on Sundays, 9pm to 9:54 pm. The series debuted on April 24, 2011, and its first episode was extended by 20 minutes. The seventh episode was extended by ten minutes.

The last episode of this series was extended by 30 minutes. Before the airing of this episode, a special program entitled  was aired. The program was hosted by the lead stars Mana Ashida and Fuku Suzuki. The last episode also featured a special guest appearance by AKB48 member Atsuko Maeda, who would be starring as Mizuki Ashiya in the following television series Hanazakari no Kimitachi e -Ikemen Paradice-2011.

On September 2, 2011, it was announced that the Marumo no Okite SP would air on October 9, 2011 at 9 pm on Fuji TV. The show retained its main cast and was a two-hour long special program.

The series made a return in 2014, showing the life of the twins four years after the main series. In 2016, Television Jamaica acquired broadcast rights to the drama and began airing it on the Caribbean island of Jamaica (its only operative territory) in English audio.

Episodes 
{| class="wikitable" style="text-align:center"
|- style="text-align:center"
!
! Episode title
! Romanized title
! Translation of title
! Broadcast date
! Ratings
|-
|  ||align=left |  ||align=left |  ||align=left |  ||align=left |  ||align=left | 
|-
|  ||align=left |  ||align=left |  ||align=left | {{center|From Today, This Will be You Guys' Home}} ||align=left |  ||align=left | 
|-
|  ||align=left |  ||align=left |  ||align=left |  ||align=left |  ||align=left | 
|-
|  ||align=left |  ||align=left |  ||align=left |  ||align=left |  ||align=left | 
|-
|  ||align=left |  ||align=left |  ||align=left |  ||align=left |  ||align=left | 
|-
|  ||align=left |  ||align=left |  ||align=left |  ||align=left |  ||align=left | 
|-
|  ||align=left |  ||align=left |  ||align=left |  ||align=left |  ||align=left | 
|-
|  ||align=left |  ||align=left |  ||align=left |  ||align=left |  ||align=left | 
|-
|  ||align=left |  ||align=left |  ||align=left |  ||align=left |  ||align=left | 
|-
|  ||align=left |  ||align=left |  ||align=left |  ||align=left |  ||align=left | 
|-
|  ||align=left |  ||align=left |  ||align=left |  ||align=left |  ||align=left | 
|-
!colspan="6"|Ratings for Kanto region (average rating: 15.48%)
|-
|  ||align=left |  ||align=left |  ||align=left |  ||align=left |  ||align=left | 
|-
|  ||align=left |  ||align=left |  ||align=left |  ||align=left |  ||align=left | 
|-
|}

 Reception Marumo no Okite was scheduled for the same time slot as the much anticipated television drama JIN 2 that is shown during TBS Sunday's 9:00 pm Drama slot. However, Asahi Shimbun reported on June 7, 2011 that Marumo no Okite managed to get within a 2.6% rating difference. Later, the seventh episode ratings crossed the 20% mark, reaching a high of 21.1%, which rivaled JIN 2's peak of 23.7%. On the same day, JIN 2 posted an average rating of 18.7%, and viewership peaked at 21.5%.Marumo no Okite debuted with an average rating of 11.6% for its first episode. Viewership in Sendai Sendai TV) reached a high of 17.2% in that episode. Later, the drama's seventh episode managed to garner an average rating of 16.1% in the Kantō region (Fuji TV). During that episode, the viewership peaked briefly at 9:57 pm with a rating of 21.1%, marking the first time the drama has crossed the 20% mark.Marumo no Okite's final episode garnered a 23.9% rating in the Kantō region and a rating of 20.6% in the Kansai Region (Kansai TV). The viewership rating peaked at 27.5% during the time period from 10:14 pm to 10:16 pm. The average rating of this episode was 6.7 percentage points more than the previous record set by the eighth episode.

Actress Mana Ashida received the "Best Performance by an Actress" award at the 2011 Tokyo Drama Awards for her role in Marumo no Okite. She shared this award with actress Kyōka Suzuki, who won the award for her role in the NHK television series Second Virgin''.

Soundtrack

Single "Maru Maru Mori Mori!"

Original Soundtrack album 

The  was released on June 1, 2011 by Pony Canyon. It was released in CD format, and it contains 75 minutes worth of soundtracks.

Track listing

International Broadcast 
In Bangladesh, it aired on NTV dubbing in Bangla on every Friday at 9.40 a.m. and beginning December 23, 2016, Friday.

References

External links 
  

Japanese drama television series
2011 Japanese television series debuts
2011 Japanese television series endings
Live-action shows scored by Hiroyuki Sawano
Fuji TV dramas